Birnie Road Halt railway station served the settlement of Benholm, Aberdeenshire, Scotland from 1865 to 1966 on the Montrose and Bervie Railway.

History 
The station opened on 1 November 1865 by the Scottish North Eastern Railway. It was a request stop and trains only called on Fridays. It closed to both passengers on 1 October 1951 and closed to goods on 23 May 1966.

References

External links 

Disused railway stations in Aberdeenshire
Former North British Railway stations
Railway stations in Great Britain opened in 1865
Railway stations in Great Britain closed in 1951
1865 establishments in Scotland
1966 disestablishments in Scotland